Accumulation by dispossession is a concept presented by the Marxist geographer David Harvey. It defines neoliberal capitalist policies that result in a centralization of wealth and power in the hands of a few by dispossessing the public and private entities of their wealth or land. Such policies are visible in many western nations from the 1970s and to the present day. Harvey argues these policies are guided mainly by four practices: privatization, financialization, management and manipulation of crises, and state redistributions.

Practices

Privatization
Privatization and commodification of public assets have been among the most criticized and disputed aspects of neoliberalism. Summed up, they could be characterized by the process of transferring property from public ownership to private ownership. According to Marxist theory, this serves the interests of the capitalist class, or bourgeoisie, as it moves power from the nation's governments to private parties. At the same time, privatization generates a means for profit for the capitalist class; after a transaction they can then sell or rent to the public what used to be commonly owned, or use it as capital through the capitalist mode of production to generate more capital.

Financialization
The wave of financialization that set in the 1980s is facilitated by governmental deregulation which has made the financial system one of the main centers of redistributive activity. Stock promotions, Ponzi schemes, structured asset destruction through inflation, asset stripping through mergers and acquisitions, dispossession of assets (raiding of pension funds and their decimation by stock and corporate collapses) by credit and stock manipulations, are, according to Harvey, central features of the post-1970s capitalist financial system. That aspect relies entirely on the fact that the quantity of money in circulation and therefore demand levels and price levels are controlled by the boards of directors of privately owned banks.

Those boards of directors are also on boards of corporations and any number of other legal vehicles who are also profiting from asset price swings. At the heart of accumulation by dispossession is the private control of the quantity of money supply that can be manipulated for private gain, which includes creating unemployment or restive conditions in the population. This process is well documented in English history as far back as prior to the founding of the Bank of England and before that in the Netherlands. The process works well with or without a central bank and with or without gold backing. The details are also manipulated from time to time as needed to satisfy popular rage or apathy.

Management and manipulation of crises
By creating and manipulating crises, such as by suddenly raising interest rates, poorer nations can be forced into bankruptcy, and agreeing to such deals like that of the structural adjustment programs can yield more damages to those nations.  Harvey reasoned that this is authorized by parties such as the U.S. Treasury, World Bank and the International Monetary Fund.

State redistributions
The neoliberal nation-state is one of the most important agents of redistributive policies. Even when privatization or commodification appear to be profitable to the lower class, in the long run it can affect the economy negatively. The state seeks redistributions through a variety of things, like changing  the tax code to profit returns on investment rather than incomes and wages (of the lower classes).

Examples
Margaret Thatcher's program for the privatization of social housing in Britain was initially seen as beneficial for the lower classes which could now move from rental to ownership at a relatively low cost, gain control over assets and increase their wealth. However, housing speculation took over following the transfers (particularly in the prime central locations), and low-income populations were forced out to the periphery. Ultimately, the new homeowners were also borrowers and paid portions of their yearly income as interest on long-term mortgages, effectively transferring a portion of their wealth to the owners of banks with licenses to create debt money from fractional reserves. Thatcher's council privatization scheme increased the potential number of borrowers in the UK by up to 20% of UK residents who lived in council housing at the end of the 1970s. Contemporary examples include attempts to deprive people of land in places like Nandigram in India and eMacambini in South Africa.

Privatization is the process of transferring public assets from the state to the private companies. Productive assets include natural resources, such as earth, forest, water, and air. Such are assets that states have used to hold in trust for the people it represents. To privatize them away and sell them as stock to private companies is what Harvey calls accumulation by dispossession.

State redistributions can be in the form of contracts given to power groups: for large infrastructures, services paid by the state and carried out by private enterprise, defense developments, research projects. One would have to find out if those contracts serve public good in a fair way or if they sustain a power structure. Also, the granting of licenses for all sorts of state sanctioned activities can turn out as unfair wealth distribution. Another important redistribution channel is by State supported financing of private enterprise activities.

Relation to Marxism
Harvey links these practices to what Karl Marx called original or primitive accumulation, and ties these to examples from the real world. He therefore draws on the theory of ongoing primitive accumulation by Rosa Luxemburg as laid out in The Accumulation of Capital. The neoliberal modernity is, according to Harvey, a modernity in which dispossession plays a large role and in which the capital class is gaining power at the expense of the labour class.

Contemporary movements against accumulation by dispossession

 Abahlali baseMjondolo in South Africa
 The Bhumi Uchhed Pratirodh Committee in India
 The EZLN in Mexico
 Fanmi Lavalas in Haiti
 The Homeless Workers' Movement in Brazil
 The Landless Peoples Movement in South Africa
 The Landless Workers' Movement in Brazil
 Movement for Justice en el Barrio in the United States
 Narmada Bachao Andolan in India
 The Western Cape Anti-Eviction Campaign in South Africa
 Occupy Homes in the United States
 Take Back the Land in the United States

See also

 Capital accumulation
 Common land
 Primitive accumulation of capital
 Property is theft!
 Socialist accumulation
 The internal contradictions of capital accumulation
 Wage slavery

References

Further reading
 
 Harvey, D. 2004. The 'new' imperialism: accumulation by dispossession. Socialist Register 40: 63-87.
 David Harvey, Reading Marx's Capital
 Reading Marx’s Capital – Class 12, Chapters 26-33, The Secret of Primitive Accumulation (video lecture)
 The Nation-State, Core and Periphery: A Brief sketch of Imperialism in the 20th century.

Marxian economics
Socialism